The Moaif tree frog (Litoria mystax) is a species of frog in the subfamily Pelodryadinae, endemic to West Papua, Indonesia. Its natural habitat is subtropical or tropical moist lowland forests.

Taxonomy 
Litoria mystax is part of the species-group L. bicolor, which was created to accommodate 7 species from the region that had characteristics in common.

The other members of the group are: Litoria cooloolensis and Litoria fallax in Australia; Litoria bicolor in Austrália and Papua New Guine; Litoria bibonius, Litoria contrastens, Litoria longicrus and Litoria mystax in Papua New Guine.

References

Litoria
Amphibians of Western New Guinea
Amphibians described in 1906
Taxonomy articles created by Polbot